John Thomas Wilson (April 16, 1811October 6, 1891) was a soldier, attorney and U.S. Representative from Ohio, serving three terms from 1867 to 1873.

Biography
Wilson was born in the village of Bell in rural Highland County, Ohio. As a child, he received a limited schooling and did not have a higher education. He engaged in mercantile and agricultural pursuits.

Civil War
During the American Civil War, he was appointed as the first lieutenant of Company E, Seventieth Regiment, Ohio Volunteer Infantry on November 2, 1861. He was discharged as a captain on November 27, 1862.

Congress 
He was a member of the Ohio Senate from 1863 to 1866 and was elected as a Republican to the Fortieth, Forty-first, and Forty-second Congresses (serving from March 4, 1867 until March 3, 1873). He was also a chairman on the Committee on Agriculture (Forty-first and Forty-second Congresses). He was an unsuccessful candidate for reelection in 1872 to the Forty-third Congress.

Death
He died in the village of Tranquillity (near what is now known as Seaman), Adams County, Ohio, at the age of eighty. He is buried in Tranquillity Cemetery. Restored by Ralph and Patricia Alexander, The John T. Wilson Homestead Wilson built and lived in Tranquillity, Ohio still can be visited by the public.

References

 (Source Link:)

History of John T. Wilson

1811 births
1891 deaths
People from Highland County, Ohio
Union Army officers
Republican Party Ohio state senators
19th-century American politicians
Republican Party members of the United States House of Representatives from Ohio